Hove by-election may refer to:

 1965 Hove by-election
 1973 Hove by-election